The 1966 Boston University Terriers football team was an American football team that represented Boston University as an independent during the 1966 NCAA College Division football season. In its third season under head coach Warren Schmakel, the team compiled a 5–5 record and outscored opponents by a total of 182 to 155.

Schedule

References

Boston University
Boston University Terriers football seasons
Boston University Terriers football